Tropaiouchos (before 1929: Μαχαλάς - Machalas) is a village in Florina regional unit, Western Macedonia, Greece.

According to the statistics of Vasil Kanchov ("Macedonia, Ethnography and Statistics"), 600 Muslim Turks and 110 Muslim Albanians lived in the village in 1900.

The Greek census (1920) recorded 450 people in the village and in 1923 there were 350 inhabitants (or 97 families) who were Muslim. Following the Greek-Turkish population exchange, in 1926 within Machalas there were refugee families from East Thrace (18), Asia Minor (12) and the Caucasus (30). The Greek census (1928) recorded 430 village inhabitants. There were 50 refugee families (213 people) in 1928.

References

Populated places in Florina (regional unit)